Wilfred Chikpa Anagbe  (born 1965) is a Nigerian prelate of the Catholic Church, serving as bishop of the Diocese of Makurdi. He was appointed coadjutor bishop of Makurdi in 2014, and succeeded to the office of bishop in 2015.

Anagbe has performed the following duties in his priestly career:
 1994–1998: Director of Vocations of the Claretian PP. in Nigeria
 1996–1998: School manager, Claretian School Board
 1998–2000: Parish priest of St. Peter's Parish, Gariki, Diocese of Enugu
 2000–2004: Farm Manager, Claretian Farm Project, Utonkon
 2003–2004: Parish Priest of St. Fidelis Parish, Allan, and Dean of Utonkon of the Diocese of Otukpo
 2004–2005: Theology course at the University of Salamanca (interrupted when he was elected Provincial Bursar)
 2005–2015: Provincial Bursar of the Claretians in Nigeria
 2008–2013: Member of the Economic Council of the Claretian Generalate in Rome
 2009–2012: Military Chaplain of the 34th Artilery Brigade, Obinze
 2013–2015: Military Chaplain 3rd Battalion Effurun Barracks, Warri.

Persecution of Christians 
In July 2022 Anagbe told Aid to the Church in Need that over 60 Christians had been killed in Benue State in the past two months.

In a speech in the European Parliament in October 2022, Anagbe compared the situation of Christians in his country to "nothing short of a Jihad clothed in many names: terrorism, kidnappings, killer herdsmen, banditry, other militia groups" and called on the international community to abandon what he termed a "conspiracy of silence" on the subject.

References 

1965 births
Living people
Nigerian Roman Catholic bishops
Roman Catholic bishops of Makurdi
People from Benue State
21st-century Nigerian clergy